Elias Ymer was the defending champion but lost in the second round to Alessandro Giannessi.

Paolo Lorenzi won the title after defeating Matteo Donati 6–3, 4–6, 7–6(9–7) in the final.

Seeds

Draw

Finals

Top half

Bottom half

References
 Main Draw
 Qualifying Draw

Citta di Caltanissetta - Singles
2016 Singles